Rayon is a manufactured fibre.

Rayon may also refer to:
 Rayón (disambiguation), the name of several places in Mexico
 Raion, an administrative division of some post-Soviet states
 Operation Rayon, Allied deception operation in WWII

People
 Rayon Griffith (born 1979), Guyanese cricketer
 Rayon Thomas (born 1981), Guyanese cricketer 
 Ignacio López Rayón (1773–1832), general in the Mexican War of Independence 
 Roy Rayon (born 1959), Jamaican singer